Earl Collins is the name of the following people:

 Earl Gregory Collins (born 1960), Anglican priest and former Benedictine abbot
 Earl Collins (1895–1958), American politician